Wesley Koolhof and Artem Sitak were the defending champions but chose not to defend their title.

Karol Drzewiecki and Filip Polášek won the title after defeating Guido Andreozzi and Guillermo Durán 6–3, 6–4 in the final.

Seeds

Draw

References
 Main Draw
 Qualifying Draw

Pekao Szczecin Open - Doubles
2018 Doubles